Camilla Martin Nygaard (née Martin; born 23 March 1974) is a retired badminton player from Denmark. She and Lene Køppen, who played two decades earlier, are the only Danish women to have won both the All England and World Championships singles titles.

Career 
She primarily played woman's singles. In that discipline she won the Danish national championships 13 years consecutively, from 1991 to 2003, European champion three times, in 1996, 1998, and 2000, and World champion once in 1999. She won All England Open in 2002.

The only major tournament that she never won was the Olympic Games. She earned silver in 2000 Olympics after losing to Gong Zhichao of China in the final.

In Camilla Martin's last year as an elite player, she played at the 2004 Olympics, defeating Kanako Yonekura of Japan in the first round but losing to Tracey Hallam of Great Britain in the round of 16.

She helped Denmark win the European team championship in 1996, 1998, 2000,2002 and 2004.

Personal life 
Camilla Martin is the daughter of the former Danish footballer Bent Martin. Her brother is the former Danish footballer Ken Martin.

She married economist Lars Nygaard 25 May 2005, and changed her name to Camilla Martin Nygaard.

She currently works as co-host of the Danish football magazine, Onside.

Achievements

Olympic Games 
Women's singles

World Championships 
Women's singles

World Cup 
Women's singles

European Championships 
Women's singles

World Junior Championships 
The Bimantara World Junior Championships was an international invitation badminton tournament for junior players. It was held in Jakarta, Indonesia from 1987 to 1991.

Girls' singles

European Junior Championships 
Girls' singles

Girls' doubles

IBF World Grand Prix 
The World Badminton Grand Prix was sanctioned by the International Badminton Federation from 1983 to 2006.

Women's singles

IBF International 
Women's singles

Women's doubles

Record against selected opponents 
Record against year-end Finals finalists, World Championships semi-finalists, and Olympic quarter-finalists.

References

External links
 Camilla Martin at BadmintonDenmark.com
 
 

1974 births
Living people
Sportspeople from Aarhus
Danish female badminton players
Badminton players at the 1992 Summer Olympics
Badminton players at the 1996 Summer Olympics
Badminton players at the 2000 Summer Olympics
Badminton players at the 2004 Summer Olympics
Olympic badminton players of Denmark
Olympic silver medalists for Denmark
Olympic medalists in badminton
Medalists at the 2000 Summer Olympics
World No. 1 badminton players
Danish television presenters
Danish women television presenters